Tanzania Mercantile Exchange is a commodity exchange in Tanzania. The commodities exchange is put in place to help various farmers access the domestic and global market better and obtain a fair price in selling of their produce. The exchange is currently undergoing training of their staff and is and has begun pilot trading in Sesame Seeds and Green Grams. The exchange plans to trade in coffee, cashew nuts, sesame, rice, sunflowers and maize, which are all currently traded under the warehouse receipt system. The Capital Market and Securities Authority (CMSA) currently oversees the operations of the exchange and is in the process of educating farmers to use the system, however, many farmers are skeptical to the system.

The exchange is supposed to be electronic based and floor based, however, the exchange has opted to begin with a floor based trading system to gain the trust of the small farmers. Many farmers, especially coffee farmers are used to the electronic auction system at the Moshi Coffee Exchange. The TMX and the Coffee board of Tanzania is looking integrate their platforms to create a single window system.

History
The exchange was the idea of President Jakaya Kikwete, who wanted to emulate a similar model in Tanzania after visiting the Ethiopia Commodity Exchange. The exchange was licensed by the Capital Market and Securities authority of Tanzania and incorporated on 25 August 2014. The Exchange was inaugurated in November 2015 by Jakaya Kikwete and commenced operations in Sesame seeds in 2019.

Corporate affairs

Ownership
The exchange is established under a private-public partnership with the Government of Tanzania regulated by the Capital Markets and Securities Authority. The company has an authorized share capital of TSh.50 billion/= and is divided between four investors. The public sector owns 49% of the share capital and the private sector owns 51%. The first four shareholders are the Treasury Registrar, TIB Development Bank, Public Service Pension Fund (PSPF) and the Tanzanian Federation of Cooperatives (TFC).

Operations

Commodities Traded 
As of December 2020, the following commodities are traded on the exchange.

See also 
 Dar es Salaam Stock Exchange
 Agriculture in Tanzania

References

External links 

Financial services companies established in 2014
Economy of Tanzania
Commodity exchanges
Companies of Tanzania